Mutaro Kunda Forest Park  is a forest park in the Gambia. Established on January 1, 1954, it covers 809 hectares. 

Protected areas established in 1954
Forest parks of the Gambia